Fly High is the debut EP by South Korean boy group Infinite's sub-unit Infinite H. The EP was released on January 11 and immediately topped the charts upon release.

Background
After a series of image and video teasers, the music video for promotional track "Special Girl" was released on January 10, 2013 on Woollim Entertainment's official YouTube channel and following the music video's release, the duo also performed the song and their follow up track "Without You" on M! Countdown on the same day. Following the release of the music video, the EP was officially released on January 11, 2013.

Composition
Focusing mainly on the genre hip hop, Infinite H (Dongwoo and Hoya) collaborated with many different artists, including various well-known hip hop composers and rappers such as Primary, Zion.T, Bumkey, Paloalto, Vida Loca, and more. The album's title track, "Fly High," features labelmate Baby Soul, who was featured on the sub-unit's first ever track "Crying" as well.

Music video
The music video for "Special Girl" was uploaded onto Woollim Entertainment's official YouTube channel on January 10, 2013 and on January 28, 2013, the music video for the follow up track, "Without You" was also uploaded onto YouTube.

Promotion
Infinite H began their promotions by performing their title track and their follow up song, "Without You" on January 10, 2013 episode of Mnet's M! Countdown on the same day when the music video for "Special Girl" was released. The duo also performed on Music Bank and Show! Music Core on January 11 and 12 respectively. They continued to perform on various music programs to promote the EP.

Track listing

Charts

Album

Sales

Release history

References

External links
 Fly High on iTunes
 
 
 

2013 EPs
Korean-language EPs
Infinite (group) albums
Woollim Entertainment EPs
Kakao M EPs